Kieran Lillis  is a Gaelic footballer from Portlaoise in County Laois.

He usually plays in defence or midfield for the Laois county football team and in 2007 was part of the Laois team that won the Leinster Minor Football Championship.

Honours
Club
 Laois Senior Football Championship (10):2009, 2010, 2011, 2012, 2013, 2014, 2015, 2017, 2018, 2019
Leinster Senior Club Football Championship (1): 2009

County
 Leinster Minor Football Championship (1): 2007

References

1990 births
Living people
Dual players
Laois inter-county Gaelic footballers
Portlaoise Gaelic footballers